Bengt Logardt (9 October 1914 – 25 September 1994) was a Swedish actor, screenwriter and film director. He appeared in more than 30 films between 1941 and 1959.

Selected filmography

 How to Tame a Real Man (1941)
 Take Care of Ulla (1942)
 Captured by a Voice (1943)
 Incorrigible (1946)
 Song of Stockholm (1947)
 Life in the Finnish Woods (1947)
 Music in Darkness (1948)
 The Devil and the Smalander (1949)
 Kvinnan bakom allt (1951)
 Count Svensson (1951)
 Stronger Than the Law (1951)
 A Night in the Archipelago (1953)
 Unmarried Mothers (1953)
 A Night at Glimmingehus (1954)
 Laughing in the Sunshine (1956)
 My Passionate Longing (1956)

External links

1914 births
1994 deaths
Swedish male film actors
Swedish male screenwriters
Swedish film directors
People from Skellefteå Municipality
20th-century Swedish male actors
20th-century Swedish screenwriters
20th-century Swedish male writers